
MacFarlane or Macfarlane is a surname derived from the Gaelic patronymic Mac Phàrlain (son of Parlan), shared by:

A 
 Alan Macfarlane (born 1941), professor of anthropological science at Cambridge University
 Alan Brock MacFarlane (1924–2018), lawyer, judge and political figure in British Columbia
 Alexander Macfarlane (disambiguation) (or Alex or MacFarlane), several people
 Sir Alistair MacFarlane (1931–2021), British electrical engineer
 Allison Macfarlane, chairman of the United States Nuclear Regulatory Commission
 Amy MacFarlane (born 1974), former field hockey forward
 Andrew Macfarlane (died 1819), Anglican clergyman who served as a bishop in the Scottish Episcopal Church
 Angus Hikairo Macfarlane, New Zealand, schoolteacher and educational psychologist

B 
 Bruce MacFarlane, Canadian lawyer, Crown prosecutor, legal scholar, and former federal and provincial Department of Justice official

C 
 Catharine Macfarlane (1877–1969), American obstetrician and gynecologist
 Charles Macfarlane (1799–1858), Scottish writer
 Clarence W. Macfarlane (1858–1947), Hawaiian businessman and yachtsman

D 
 Dave MacFarlane (1967–2013), Scottish professional football player who is best known for his time with Kilmarnock
 David Macfarlane (born 1952), Canadian journalist, playwright and novelist
 Donald MacFarlane (1834–1926), Scottish preacher
 Donald Horne Macfarlane (1830–1904)
 Donna MacFarlane (born 1977), Australian middle distance and steeplechase runner
 Dorothy Macfarlane, an English cricketer
 Doug MacFarlane (1880–1965), English professional footballer who played for Barrow, Burnley and Tottenham Hotspur
 Duncan Macfarlane (1827–1903), New Zealand grocer, merchant, government agent, farmer and magistrate

E 
 Ed Macfarlane (born 1984), singer, instrumentalist, producer, and the principal songwriter of Friendly Fires
 Edward C. Macfarlane (1848–1902), Hawaiian politician and businessman
 Edith Mary Macfarlane (1871–1948), New Zealand community worker
 Eve MacFarlane, New Zealand rower

G 
 Gaynor Macfarlane, radio drama director and producer for BBC Radio Drama at Pacific Quay, Glasgow
 George G. Macfarlane (1916–2007), engineer, scientific administrator and public servant
 George W. Macfarlane (1849–1921), Hawaiian politician, royal chamberlain and businessman
 Gus MacFarlane (1925–1991), Canadian Liberal MP for Hamilton Mountain

H 
 Helen Macfarlane, a Scottish Chartist feminist journalist and philosopher

I 
 Ian Macfarlane (disambiguation) (or MacFarlane), several people

J 
 James Macfarlane (disambiguation)
 Jean Macfarlane, American psychologist
 John MacFarlane (disambiguation) (or John Macfarlane), several people
 Jacobus Carolus Jc MacFarlane, South African Politician and lawyer

K 
 Karla MacFarlane, Canadian politician
 Katie MacFarlane (born 1982), former American women's basketball player and a current U.S. Army intelligence officer
 Kee MacFarlane (born 1947), Director of Children's Institute International
 Kris MacFarlane (born 1975), Canadian freelance drummer

L 
 Laura MacFarlane, rock and roll musician
 Les MacFarlane (1919–1986), Australian politician
 Lorne MacFarlane (1904–1971), farmer and political figure in Prince Edward Island, Canada
 Luke Macfarlane (born 1980), Canadian actor

M 
 Malcolm MacFarlane (1853–1931), Scottish Gaelic scholar and songwriter
 Mike Macfarlane (born 1964), former catcher in Major League Baseball

N 
 Neil MacFarlane (footballer) (born 1977), Scottish professional footballer
 Neil Macfarlane (politician) (born 1936), British Conservative politician and former Minister for Sport
 Norman Macfarlane, Baron Macfarlane of Bearsden (1926–2021), British businessman and Conservative member of the House of Lords

R 
 Rab Macfarlane (1875–?), Scottish footballer in 1902 Scottish Cup Final
 Rachael MacFarlane (born 1976), voice actress and sister of Seth MacFarlane
 Robert MacFarlane (disambiguation) (or Robert Macfarlane), several people
 Ronald D. Macfarlane, distinguished professor of Chemistry at Texas A&M University

S 
 Sandy MacFarlane (1878–?), Scottish football player and manager
 Seth MacFarlane (born 1973), American actor, voice actor and animator, best known for his show Family Guy
 Stewart MacFarlane (born 1953), figurative Australian painter

T 
 Thomas Macfarlane (1811–1885), 19th-century Member of Parliament from the Auckland Region, New Zealand

W 
 Walter Scott MacFarlane (1896–1979), Canadian bard and soldier

See also
McFarlane (surname)

English-language surnames
Surnames of Scottish origin
Anglicised Scottish Gaelic-language surnames